Think Fast is an American television quiz show that ran on ABC from March 26, 1949 to October 8, 1950.

Media critic John Crosby described the program as "an adult's version of the old child's game, 'King of the Hill'". The quiz show revolved around a group of five panelists (three regulars and two weekly guest panelists) who would compete to see who had the most to say about a particular subject. They sat at a large table, each getting a chance to sit at the "King's" throne by out talking the others on subjects decided by the host. The regular panelists were Leon Janney, David Broekman, who was also the show's musical director, and Eloise McElhone. The moderator was Mason Gross for the first episodes, then Gypsy Rose Lee afterward. Rex Stout was host for the September 3, 1950, episode.

The program originally aired on Saturdays until April, followed by Fridays until September, then Sundays from 7 to 7:30 p.m. Eastern Time for the rest of its run.

The show's producer was Robert Kennings.

Panelists
 Mason Welch Gross, as moderator
 Gypsy Rose Lee, as moderator after Gross left the show
 Leon Janney
 David Broekman
 Eloise McElhone

See also
 1949–50 United States network television schedule

References
 
 Brooks, Tim and Marsh, Earle; The Complete Directory to Prime Time Network and Cable TV Shows,

External links
 
1949 American television series debuts
1950 American television series endings
1940s American game shows
1950s American game shows
American Broadcasting Company original programming
Black-and-white American television shows